In linguistics, a broken plural (or internal plural) is an irregular plural form of a noun or adjective found in the Semitic languages and other Afroasiatic languages such as Berber. Broken plurals are formed by changing the pattern of consonants and vowels inside the singular form. They contrast with sound plurals (or external plurals), which are formed by adding a suffix, but are also formally distinct from phenomena like the Germanic umlaut, a form of vowel mutation used in plural forms in Germanic languages.

There have been a variety of theoretical approaches to understanding these processes and varied attempts to produce systems or rules that can systematize these plural forms. However, the question of the origin of the broken plurals for the languages that exhibit them is not settled, though there are certain probabilities in distributions of specific plural forms in relation to specific singular patterns. As the conversions outgo by far the extent of mutations caused by the Germanic umlaut that is evidenced to be caused by inflectional suffixes, the sheer multiplicity of shapes corresponds to multiplex attempts at historical explanation ranging from proposals of transphonologizations and multiple accentual changes to switches between the categories of collectives, abstracta and plurals or noun class switches.

Arabic
While the phenomenon is known from several Semitic languages, it is most productive in Arabic.

For feminine nouns, the regular way is to add the suffix . However, not all plurals follow these simple rules. One class of nouns in both spoken and written Arabic produce plurals by changing the pattern of vowels inside the word, sometimes also with the addition of a prefix or suffix. This system is not fully regular, and it is used mainly for masculine non-human nouns; human nouns are pluralized regularly or irregularly.

These plurals constitute one of the most unusual aspects of the language, given the very strong and highly detailed grammar and derivation rules that govern the written language. Broken plurals can also be found in languages that have borrowed words from Arabic, for instance Persian, Pashto, Turkish, Kurdish, Azerbaijani, and Urdu. Sometimes in these languages the same noun has both a broken plural Arabic form and a local plural. E.g. in Pashto the word for "purpose"  can be pluralised in either its Arabic form   for more formal, High Pashto. (Cf. the treatment of Latin words in English; e.g. the plural of index is either indices or indexes, the latter being more informal.)

In Persian this kind of plural is known by its Arabic term  (literally "broken plural"). However the Persian Academy of Literature (Farhangestan) does not recommend the usage of such Arabic plural forms, but instead the native Persian plural suffix .

Full knowledge of these plurals can come only with extended exposure to the Arabic language, though a few rules can be noted. One study computed the probability that the pattern of vowels in the singular would predict the pattern in the broken plural (or vice versa) and found values ranging from 20% to 100% for different patterns.

A statistical analysis of a list of the 3000 most frequent Arabic words shows that 978 (59%) of the 1670 most frequent nominal forms take a sound plural, while the remaining 692 (41%) take a broken plural. Another estimate of all existing nominal forms gives over 90,000 forms with a sound plural and just 9540 with a broken one. This is due to the almost boundless number of participles and derived nominals in "-ī", most of which take a sound plural.

Example
Semitic languages typically utilize triconsonantal roots, forming a "grid" into which vowels may be inserted without affecting the basic root.

Here are a few examples; note that the commonality is in the root consonants (capitalized), not the vowels.

  "book" →   "books"
  "writer, scribe" →   “writers, scribes"
  "letter" →   "letters"
  "desk, office" →   "offices"
note: these four words all have a common root, K-T-B  "to write"

In the non-semitic Persian language it is current to use:

   "book" →   "books"
   "writer, scribe" →   "writers, scribes"

Patterns in Arabic

Hebrew
In Hebrew, though all plurals must take either the sound masculine or feminine plural suffixes, the historical stem alternations of the so-called segolate or consonant-cluster nouns between CVCC in the singular and CVCaC in the plural have often been compared to broken plural forms in other Semitic languages.  Thus the form   "my king" in the singular is opposed to   "kings" in the plural.

In addition, there are many other cases where historical sound changes have resulted in stem allomorphy between singular and plural forms in Hebrew (or between absolute state and construct state, or between forms with pronominal suffixes and unsuffixed forms etc.), though such alternations do not operate according to general templates accommodating root consonants, and so are not usually considered to be true broken plurals by linguists.

Geʿez (Ethiopic)
Broken plurals were formerly used in some Ethiopic nouns. Examples include ˁanbässa "lion" with ˁanabəst "lions", kokäb "star" with kwakəbt "stars", ganen "demon" with aganənt "demons", and hagar "region" with ˀahgur "regions". Some of these broken plurals are still used in Amharic today, but they are generally seen as archaic.

See also
Elative (gradation)
 Triconsonantal roots
Nonconcatenative morphology
Apophony

References

External links
Pattern-and-root inflectional morphology: the Arabic broken plural
The Arabic Noun System Generation
A detailed account of plurality in Arabic
On the way to an algorithm for forming broken plurals in Arabic

Arabic language
Semitic linguistics
Linguistic morphology
Grammatical number
Arabic grammar